Hepsiburada.com (from Turkish hepsi burada, “all of it/everything is here) is a Turkish e-commerce company that has been serving since 1998. The company was selected as Turkey's most popular brand in 2011, 2012 and 2013, and E-commerce Site of the Year in 2013. By the first quarter of 2022, it had over 12 millon users. Currently, Onal Gökçetekin is the CEO of the company.

The company was founded by Hanzade Doğan Boyner in 1998. In 2001, Doğan Holding bought the company. In February 2019, Murat Emirdağ became the CEO. He left the position in January 2023 and was succeeded by Nilhan Onal Gökçetekin.

Working System 
The company allows suppliers to make sales on the platform. Although Hepsiburada also sells products, most of the products are from suppliers rather than Hepsiburada. As of November 2022, it has over 82 thousand merchants.

References 

Online retailers of Turkey
Online companies of Turkey
Turkish companies established in 1998